Vulpinic acid is a natural product first found in and important in the symbiosis underlying the biology of lichens. It is a simple methyl ester derivative of its parent compound, pulvinic acid, and a close relative of pulvinone, both of which derive from aromatic amino acids such as phenylalanine via secondary metabolism. The roles of vulpinic acid are not fully established, but may include properties that make it an antifeedant for herbivores. The compound is relatively toxic to mammals.

Chemical description
Vulpinic acid was first isolated from lichens in 1925. As an isolated, purified substance, it is bright yellow in color.

Vulpinic acid is derived biosynthetically by esterification from pulvinic acid; pulvinate itself derives from the aromatic amino acids phenylalanine and tyrosine, via dimerization and oxidative ring-cleavage of arylpyruvic acids, a process that also produces the related pulvinones.

There have been several chemical syntheses reported for vulpinic acid. In one, butenolides were efficiently functionalized by Suzuki cross-coupling reactions via the corresponding enol triflates.

Occurrence in lichens 

Pulvinic acid is found in several lichen species, as well as some non-lichenized fungi. It is a secondary metabolite of the fungal partner in the lichen symbiosis. It was found in the bolete fungus Pulveroboletus ravenelii. In 2016, a new group of basidiomycetes distinct from the well known lichen fungal partner was implicated in producing vulpinic acid.

Bioactivities
Vulpinic acid is relatively toxic to meat-eating mammals as well as insects and molluscs. However, it is not toxic to rabbits and mice. One biological function of vulpinic acid may be as a repellent that lichens have evolved to deter grazing by herbivores. Lichens may also exploit the ultraviolet-blocking properties of the molecule, protecting the underlying photobionts. For example, vulpinic acid is thought to function as a blue light screen in Letharia vulpina. It had been shown previously to protect human skin cells in tissue culture against ultraviolet B-induced damage.

Humans have exploited its mammalian toxicity, using lichens containing high amounts of the chemical (e.g., Letharia vulpina) to poison wolves in Scandinavia, sometimes adding it to baits containing reindeer blood and glass.

Vulpinic acid has some antibacterial activity against gram-positive bacteria, and has been shown to disrupt cell division in MRSA.

See also
 Lichenology

References

Dihydrofurans
Methyl esters
Phenyl compounds
Lichen products